This is a list of radio stations located in the state of Jalisco, Mexico, in Amplitude Modulated and Frequency Modulated bands.

Actives

Historical

Closing stations

Defunct formats

References 

Jalisco
Jalisco